Hoploparia is a genus of fossil lobster belonging to the family Nephropidae. The type species of this genus is Hoploparia longimana.

These epifaunal carnivores lived from the Jurassic to the Paleogene period (from 201.6 to 28.4 Ma). Fossils of this genus have been found in sediments of Europe, Argentina, Madagascar, Canada and United States.

Species

References 

True lobsters
Hettangian first appearances
Early Jurassic crustaceans
Early Cretaceous crustaceans
Paleocene crustaceans
Eocene crustaceans
Oligocene extinctions
Fossils of Argentina
Fossil taxa described in 1849
Fossils of Madagascar
Fossils of Canada
Fossils of the United States
Oligocene crustaceans
Middle Jurassic crustaceans
Late Jurassic crustaceans
Late Cretaceous crustaceans